Koottikkada or Koottikada is a small neighbourhood of the city of Kollam. It is the 29th ward in Kollam Municipal Corporation. Koottikkada is a thickly populated area in the city. Kollam-Thiruvananthapuram railway line is passing through Koottikada. So many mosques and temples are there in this area.

Importance
Koottikada is an important growing urban area in Kollam city. The place is so close to Mayyanad railway station. Koottikkada town is easily accessible by rail, road and water that enhance the importance of this place as a major residential area in the city. Koottikkada is very close to Mayyanad, Eravipuram, Valathungal, Pallimukku and Thattamala. The town is having a favorable Male-Female sex ratio. One of the important slums in the city, 'Chiravayal Cheri' is in Koottikkada. Some of the famous Cable TV operators in the city are operating from this small town. The decisive support from Koottikkada councilor had a great role during the recent elections and political changes happened in Kollam Municipal Corporation, as he is the only elected PDP councilor in Kollam Municipal Corporation.

Famous Kathakali artist in the state, Kalamandalam Rajeev is from Koottikkada. New Holy Angels school in Koottikada is an important lower primary school in Kollam district. The under construction coastal road connecting Kollam city with Paravur town will boost the importance of Koottikkada as a major transport hub in the city. One of the main temples in this area is Sree Dharma shastha temple (known as  shasthamveli ambalam). Most popular face to face looking two mosques known by Aayiramthengu muslim jamaath and Aakkolil muslim jamaath is also situated in this region.This place is more rush in the morning and evening time due to the large number of vehicle presence while opening the railway level cross.

See also
 Kollam
 Mayyanad
 Paravur
 Kollam Municipal Corporation
 Mayyanad railway station

References

Neighbourhoods in Kollam